Tiberius Sempronius Gracchus (died 212 BC) was a Roman republican consul in the Second Punic War. He was son of the Tiberius Sempronius Gracchus who was consul in 238 BC, who was apparently the first man from his branch of the family to become a consul.

Political career 
Gracchus is first mentioned in 216 BC as a curule aedile; he was made magister equitum in the dictatorship of Marcus Junius Pera after the defeat at Cannae.

He was elected consul to serve for 215 BC, at the recommendation of the dictator, whose orders he had faithfully obeyed even when obliged to abandon Italian allies to their fate. His colleague-elect Lucius Postumius Albinus being killed in an ambush in Gaul on his way home. Marcus Claudius Marcellus was elected suffect consul, but his election was declared invalid by the augurs, who forced him to resign. The invalidity was supposedly the result of patrician agitation, claiming that two plebeians could not serve as consuls together. Quintus Fabius Maximus Verrucosus was then elected suffect consul to serve out the year. During his consulship, Gracchus raised forces and took his forces to garrison Campania and the city of Cumae after conducting the elections for both suffect consuls.

During his first consulship, Fabius and the senate decided to induct volunteer slaves into the Roman army in separate legions in which they could win their freedom. Gracchus was appointed commander of the slave troops. He rapidly became known as an effective general of the volunteer slave troops, winning their loyalty and trust for his clemency when some broke and ran from the field.

He was prorogued as proconsul into 214 BC, continuing to lead his slave and freedmen troops. His slave forces captured Cumae and Philip V of Macedon's envoys to Hannibal; after preventing Hanno (Hannibal's nephew) from reinforcing Hannibal's forces in Italy, the slaves were freed for their services. 

He was re-elected consul for 213 BC. During his consulship, he appointed Gaius Claudius Centho as dictator to oversee consular elections and held military command near Luceria in northern Italy. In the next year, when he was bringing troops to reinforce Capua, when he and his men were ambushed and killed: a Roman ally defected while leading Gracchus to a place where the Carthaginian commander Mago Barca was waiting in ambush. Hannibal gave the dead general full funeral rites and returned his bones to his soldiers for burial.

Family
 His brother Publius Sempronius Gracchus was the father of the Tiberius Sempronius Gracchus who was consul in 177 BC, whose sons Tiberius Gracchus and Gaius Gracchus were the famous reformers.

References 

Sources
 
 
 Livy, Histories of Rome.
 

3rd-century BC births
212 BC deaths
3rd-century BC Roman consuls
Curule aediles
Magistri equitum (Roman Republic)
Roman commanders of the Second Punic War
Roman generals killed in action
Gracchus, Tiberius consul 539 AUC
Year of birth uncertain